Ashland High School may refer to:

In the United States 
Ashland High School (Kansas) in Ashland, Kansas
Ashland High School (Louisiana) (1907-1981), Natchitoches Parish, Louisiana
Ashland High School (Massachusetts), Ashland, Massachusetts
Ashland High School (Mississippi), Ashland, Mississippi
Ashland-Greenwood High School, Ashland, Nebraska
Ashland High School (Ohio), Ashland, Ohio
Ashland High School (Oregon), Ashland, Oregon
Ashland High School (Wisconsin), Ashland, Wisconsin
Paul G. Blazer High School, Ashland, Kentucky is the successor to the former Ashland High School, and as such is often referred to as "Ashland High School"